Tire Discounters is a tire and auto service shop started by Chip Wood in 1976 in Cincinnati, Ohio.  Today, it ranks as the eighth-largest independent tire dealer in the U.S. by Modern Tire Dealer National Rankings 2020.

History

Tire Discounters is Ohio-based, headquartered in Cincinnati. The company is owned and operated by the Wood family. In 2008, it entered the Lexington market.  In 2011, it opened a new headquarters in Sharonville, with a 200,000-square-foot warehouse. In the same year, it entered the Louisville market, and in 2014, Nashville. In 2015, the headquarters were moved to downtown Cincinnati, while maintaining warehouses in Sharonville and LaVergne, Tennessee. In 2016, the company opened its 100th store and entered the Chattanooga market. , over 130 stores are located across Ohio, Kentucky, Indiana, Tennessee, and Georgia,  and employ more than 1,300 people.  In most markets, Tire Discounters overlaps with the rival Discount Tire chain; the two are not related despite the similar names.

Tire Discounters signs
Chip Wood wrote the original signs for years. Now, a group of people writes the signs at the Cincinnati office and send them to the stores twice a week. They have been shared on BuzzFeed, Reddit, and more.

Tallest tire stack
 
In celebration of the reopening of its first store, Tire Discounters built a stack of Falken Tires on March 27, 2014, that was 19.95 ft tall. The previous tire stacking world record of 19.77 was set on September 6, 2009, in Wiesental, Germany.

Wounded Warrior Project
Tire Discounters supports Wounded Warrior Project; during a week-long event, Tire Discounters Inc. locations in three states did not charge customers labor on tires or oil changes, and instead collected donations for the Wounded Warrior Project. The first-time event raised more than $20,631. Customers donated $9,140 that week, and Tire Discounters added a $1 donation for every social-media share, phone call, and appointment booked during the event.

References

External links

American companies established in 1976
Retail companies established in 1976
Automotive part retailers of the United States
Automotive repair shops of the United States
Companies based in Cincinnati